Abraham Tedros Abraha (born 20 August 1993) is an Eritrean footballer who plays as a defender. He currently plays for the Eritrea national football team.

International career
Tedros played in the 2009 CECAFA Cup in Kenya, appearing in the opening group match against Zimbabwe.

He also took part in the 2010 CECAFA U-20 Championship in Asmara Eritrea and in World Cup Qualifying in 2011.

References

External links

Living people
1993 births
Eritrean footballers
Eritrea international footballers
Association football midfielders
Red Sea FC players
Sportspeople from Asmara
Eritrean Premier League players